Amblyseius serratus is a species of mite in the family Phytoseiidae.

References

serratus
Articles created by Qbugbot
Animals described in 1976
Taxa named by Wolfgang Karg